Adrian Voiculeţ (born 10 June 1985) is a Romanian former professional footballer who played as a forward.

Honours
Argeş Piteşti
Liga II: 2007–08

External links

1985 births
Living people
Sportspeople from Sibiu
Romanian footballers
Association football forwards
FC Bihor Oradea players
CSM Unirea Alba Iulia players
FC Argeș Pitești players
FC UTA Arad players
FC Brașov (1936) players
CS Mioveni players
Békéscsaba 1912 Előre footballers
Romanian expatriate footballers
Expatriate footballers in Hungary
Romanian expatriate sportspeople in Hungary
Expatriate footballers in Austria
Romanian expatriate sportspeople in Austria